Surjahi Puja is a festival of Jharkhand. In this festival people venerate the sun. It is celebrated every five years. It is celebrated by the Sadan people of Jharkhand.

Etymology
Surjahi is a joint word of Suraj, which means sun and ahi means is. It is celebrated to venerate the sun.

Celebration
At the festival, people venerate the sun.  The festival is celebrated once every five years. It is observed on the first three days in the month of Aghan or Magh. It is celebrated when a wish is fulfilled. It is celebrated in the courtyard of houses. In this festival, the whole family or villagers take part. The first day is for bathing, the second day is for fasting and on the third day, sacrifice takes place. People sacrifice goat and offer tapan (liquor) to sun. Then they feast. It is celebrated by the Sadan people of Jharkhand.

References

Harvest festivals in India
Hindu festivals in India
 Culture of Jharkhand
Festivals in Jharkhand
Nagpuri culture